The Mata Amarilla Formation is a fossiliferous formation of the Austral Basin in southern Patagonia, Argentina. The formation consists of sediments deposited during the Middle Cenomanian, dated to 96.94 to 95.52 Ma. The middle section of the formation was previously considered to be the Pari Aike Formation.

The Mata Amarilla Formation has provided many fossil vertebrates, among which dinosaurs, fish and turtles, as well as fossil insects, flora and molluscs.

Age 

The middle section of the Mata Amarilla Formation has widely been regarded as Maastrichtian in age, but recent dating of a lava tuff layer shows that it dates back to 96.2 ± 0.7 Ma, during the Cenomanian.

Description 
In the studied area, the Austral Basin underwent three main tectonic stages: (i) a rift stage; (ii) a thermal subsidence stage; and (iii) a foreland stage.

The rifting stage is related to the break-up of Gondwana, grabens and half-grabens were formed and filled with volcaniclastic and volcanic rocks intercalated with epiclastic sediments of the El Quemado and Tobífera Formations.

Subsequently, the thermal subsidence stage resulted in the deposition of the transgressive quartzose sandstone of the Springhill Formation, and the black mudstone and marl of the Río Mayer Formation. Towards the end of this stage, the Piedra Clavada Formation was deposited, representing a large passive-margin delta system.

The foreland stage, in response to the regional change from extensive to compressive regime, resulted in the deposition of the continental Mata Amarilla Formation. This unit is mainly composed of grey and blackish siltstone and claystone, alternating with whitish and yellowish-grey fine to medium grained sandstone. Varela (2014) recognized three informal sections (lower, middle, and upper) on the bases of sedimentological and sequence stratigraphic analysis. The lower section consists of fine-grained intervals with paleosols interbedded with laminated shale and coquina, representing coastal plain and lagoon paleoenvironments.

The middle section comprises sandstone and siltstone representing meandering fluvial channels and crevasse splay deposits, intercalated with fine-grained floodplains and subordinate lacustrine deposits. The upper section is dominated by fine-grained deposits, related to distal fluvial channels.

Fossil content

Dinosaurs

Other vertebrates 
 Ceratodus iheringi
 Lepidotes sp.
 Chelidae indet.
 Elasmosauridae indet.
 ?Docodonta indet.
 Ausktribosphenidae indet.
 Amarillodon meridionalis
 Treslagosodon shehuensis

Molluscs 
 Glyphea oculata
 Anagaudryceras cf. politissimum
 Baculites cf. kirki
 Polyptychoceras (Polyptychoceras) sp.
 cf. Potamides sp.

Insects 
 Aonikenkissus zamunerae
 Myrcia acutifolia
 M. santacruzensis
 Zygadenia sp.

Flora 
 Arcellites disciformis
 Bignonites chalianus
 Fitzroya tertiaria
 Laurophyllum kurtzi
 ?Schinopsis dubia
 Equisetites sp.
 Phylites sp.

References

Bibliography 
   Material was copied from this source, which is available under a Creative Commons Attribution 4.0 International License.
  
    available under a Creative Commons Attribution 4.0 International License

Further reading 
 J. F. Petrulevicius, A. N. Varela, A. Iglesias, A. B. Zamuner, and D. G. Poiré. 2014. First Cenomanian record of insects in the southern Hemisphere, with Perforissidae (Fulgoroidea) and Cupedidae (Coleoptera) from southern Patagonia, Argentina. Cretaceous Research 51:174-185
 J. P. O'Gorman and A. N. Varela. 2010. The oldest lower Upper Cretaceous plesiosaurs (Reptilia, Sauropterygia) from Southern Patagonia, Argentina. Ameghiniana 47(4):447-459
 A. Iglesias, A. B. Zamuner, D. G. Poiré and F. Larriestra. 2007. Diversity, taphonomy, and palaeoecology of an angiosperm flora from the Cretaceous (Cenomanian-Coniacian) in southern Patagonia, Argentina. Palaeontology 50(2):445-466
 F. J. Goin, D. G. Poire, M. S. De Fuente, A. L. Cione, F. E. Novas, E. S. Bellosi, A. Ambrosio, O. Ferrer, N. D. Canessa, A. Carloni, J. Ferigolo, A. M. Ribeiro, M. S. Sales Viana, M. A. Reguero, M. G. Vucetich, S. Marenssi, M. F. Lima Filho and S. Agostinho. 2002. Paleontologia y geologia de los sedimentos del cretacico superior aflorantes al sur del rio shehuen (Mata Amarilla, Provincia de Santa Cruz, Argentina). Actas del XV Congreso Geologico Argentino, El Calafate, 2002 1-6
 M. B. Aguirre Urreta. 1989. The Cretaceous decapod Crustacea of Argentina and the Antarctic Peninsula. Palaeontology 32(3):499-552
 J. Frenguelli. 1953. La Flora Fósil de la región del Alto Río Chalia en Santa Cruz (Patagonia). Paleontología. Notas del museo XVI(98):239-257
 F. Ameghino. 1899. Nota preliminar sobre el Loncasaurus argentinus un representante de la familia de los Megalosauridae en la República Argentina [Preliminary note on Loncasaurus argentinus, a representative of the family Megalosauridae in the Argentine Republic]. Anales de la Sociedad Científica Argentina 47:61-62

Geologic formations of Argentina
Upper Cretaceous Series of South America
Cretaceous Argentina
Cenomanian Stage
Sandstone formations
Shale formations
Siltstone formations
Tuff formations
Formations
Fossiliferous stratigraphic units of South America
Paleontology in Argentina
Geology of Santa Cruz Province, Argentina
Geology of Patagonia